The Textile Museum of Canada, located in Toronto, Ontario, Canada, is a museum dedicated to the collection, exhibition, and documentation of textiles.

History
The Textile Museum of Canada was founded as the Canadian Museum of Carpets and Textiles in 1975 by Max Allen and Simon Waegemaekers. Located above an ice cream shop in Mirvish Village the museum's collection was initially based on textiles collected during business trips. The museum relocated to its current location as in 1989. It now includes exhibitions of international contemporary art, craft, and design. It recently acknowledged the history of the land, stating on their homepage, "The Textile Museum of Canada operates on the traditional territories of the Mississaugas of the Credit, the Anishinaabe, the Chippewa, the Haudenosaunee, and the Wendat."

Collection

The Textile Museum of Canada has a permanent collection of more than 13,000 textiles from around the world.  Covering 2,000 years of textile history, the collection includes fabrics, ceremonial cloths, garments, carpets, quilts and related artifacts.

The museum presents curated exhibitions of contemporary work and historic and ethnographic artifacts drawn from its own and others’ collections. It is home to the H.N. Pullar Library, a reference collection of material focused on non-industrial textiles. The museum also offers lectures, round-table discussions, workshops, music and dance performances, hands-on demonstrations, school programs and public tours.

Canadian Tapestry: The Fabric of Cultural Diversity, one of the museum’s digitization projects, provides online access to 7,000 artifacts and a second phase will provide access to an additional 3,500 items.

Several of the museum's exhibits and publications have won multiple awards, including:

Cloth & Clay: Communicating Culture (2003) 
Canadian Tapestry: The Fabric of Cultural Diversity (2006) 
A Terrible Beauty: An Installation (2006)
Thor Hansen: Crafting a Canadian Style (2006)

Affiliations
The Museum is affiliated with: CMA, CHIN, and Virtual Museum of Canada.

See also
List of museums in Toronto

References

External links

 Textile Museum of Canada website

Museums established in 1975
Museums in Toronto
Textile museums
Textile industry of Canada
1975 establishments in Ontario